Henry of the Palatinate (German: Heinrich von der Pfalz) (Heidelberg, 15 February 1487 – Ladenburg, 3 January 1552) was Bishop of Utrecht from 1524 to 1529, Bishop of Worms from 1523 to 1552 and Bishop of Freising from 1541 to 1552.

Hendrik descended from the House of Wittelsbach and was a son of Philip, Elector Palatine. He was canon in Cologne before he was, at the recommendation of the Archbishop of Cologne, bishop of Utrecht elected by the chapters and burghers of Utrecht. But he lacked the support of Charles V, Holy Roman Emperor and Charles, Duke of Guelders, who made life difficult for him. In the bishopric, Henry faced a faction-struggle. He entertained the idea of building a fort inside the city of Utrecht to keep the citizens in check. This idea would later be realised by Charles V as the Vredenburg.

When the resistance of the Utrecht citizens escalated to the point where they invited troops from Guelders to occupy the city, Henry had no choice but to ask the Habsburgers for help. The Habsburgers quickly restored order, but in return the bishop was forced to relinquish all the lands controlled by the bishopric. The relinquishment was secured in the treaty of Schoonhoven on 15 November 1527, and on 21 October 1528 the bishop swore fealty to Charles V. This was the end of the Bishopric of Utrecht as a territorial power. In August 1529, pope Clement VII finally empowered the transfer of the lands.

Henry resigned as bishop of Utrecht in 1529 to focus on the rule of the calm bishopric of Worms, of which he had been bishop since 1523. He restored the bishop's summer-residence in Dirmstein that had been dismantled during the German Peasants' War of 1525. Later Henry was also consecrated as bishop of Freising, where his brothers Ruprecht and Philip had previously been bishops.

References

1487 births
1552 deaths
House of Wittelsbach
Prince-Bishops of Utrecht
16th-century Roman Catholic bishops in the Holy Roman Empire
Roman Catholic bishops of Worms
Clergy from Heidelberg
Roman Catholic Prince-Bishops of Freising
Sons of monarchs